Paul Moran (born 23 May 1968) is an English retired football forward.

References

Since 1888... The Searchable Premiership and Football League Player Database (subscription required)

1968 births
Living people
English footballers
Association football forwards
Premier League players
Tottenham Hotspur F.C. players
Portsmouth F.C. players
Leicester City F.C. players
Newcastle United F.C. players
Southend United F.C. players
Peterborough United F.C. players
Enfield F.C. players
Boreham Wood F.C. players
Hertford Town F.C. players
Footballers from Enfield, London